During the 2014-15 season, the Manchester Phoenix participated in the semi-professional English Premier Ice Hockey League.

Standings

English Premier League

[*] Secured play-off berth. [**] EPL League Champions

English Premier Cup - Southern Division

English Premier Cup - Northern Division

External links 
 Manchester Phoenix Official Website

Manchester Phoenix seasons
Manch